In control theory the Youla–Kučera parametrization (also simply known as Youla parametrization) is a formula that describes all possible stabilizing feedback controllers for a given plant P, as function of a single parameter Q.

Details
The YK parametrization is a general result. It is a fundamental result of control theory and launched an entirely new area of research and found application, among others, in optimal and robust control. The engineering significance of the YK formula is that if one wants to find a stabilizing controller that meets some additional criterion, one can adjust the parameter Q such that the desired criterion is met.

For ease of understanding and as suggested by Kučera it is best described for three increasingly general kinds of plant.

Stable SISO plant

Let  be a transfer function of a stable single-input single-output system (SISO) system. Then, the set of all proper stabilizing controllers for the plant  can be defined as

,

where  is an arbitrary proper and stable function of s. It can be said, that  parametrizes all stabilizing controllers for the plant .

General SISO plant

Consider a general plant with a transfer function . Further, the transfer function can be factorized as

, where ,  are stable and proper functions of s.

Now, solve the Bézout's identity of the form

,

where the variables to be found  must be also proper and stable.

After proper and stable  are found, we can define one stabilizing controller that is of the form . After we have one stabilizing controller at hand, we can define all stabilizing controllers using a parameter  that is proper and stable. The set of all stabilizing controllers is defined as

.

General MIMO plant

In a multiple-input multiple-output (MIMO) system, consider a transfer matrix . It can be factorized using right coprime factors   or left factors . The factors must be proper, stable and doubly coprime, which ensures that the system  is controllable and observable. This can be written by Bézout identity of the form:

.

After finding  that are stable and proper, we can define the set of all stabilizing controllers  using left or right factor, provided having negative feedback.

where  is an arbitrary stable and proper parameter. 

Let  be the transfer function of the plant and let  be a stabilizing controller. Let their right coprime factorizations be:

then all stabilizing controllers can be written as
 
where  is stable and proper.

References

D. C. Youla, H. A. Jabri, J. J. Bongiorno: Modern Wiener-Hopf design of optimal controllers: part II, IEEE Trans. Automat. Contr., AC-21 (1976) pp319–338
V. Kučera: Stability of discrete linear feedback systems. In: Proceedings of the 6th IFAC. World Congress, Boston, MA, USA, (1975).
C. A. Desoer, R.-W. Liu, J. Murray, R. Saeks. Feedback system design: the fractional representation approach to analysis and synthesis. IEEE Trans. Automat. Contr., AC-25 (3), (1980) pp399–412
John Doyle, Bruce Francis, Allen Tannenbaum. Feedback control theory. (1990). 

Control theory